Pulverbach is a river in Bavaria, Germany. It is a right tributary of the Klosterbach in Höchstädt an der Donau.

See also
List of rivers of Bavaria

Rivers of Bavaria
Rivers of Germany